Bistrica is a settlement in the Municipality of Naklo in the Upper Carniola region of Slovenia.

Geography

The Tržič Bistrica River, a tributary of the Sava River, flows through the village.

References

External links 

Bistrica on Geopedia

Populated places in the Municipality of Naklo